George J. Tate was an American sports executive who owned the Cleveland Tate Stars baseball franchise in the Negro National League in 1922. Tate also served as vice president of the league in 1922.

References

External links
The Encyclopedia of Cleveland History

Year of birth missing
Year of death missing
Baseball executives
African-American sports executives and administrators
American sports executives and administrators